The Alex McKnight series is a fictional crime series by author Steve Hamilton featuring protagonist Alex McKnight, a former Detroit police cop. The setting for the books is Paradise, a town in the Upper Peninsula of Michigan. The series is published by Minotaur Books.

Awards and honors
The first book in the series, A Cold Day in Paradise, won both the Edgar Award and the Shamus Award for Best First Novel. Hamilton has twice been a finalist for the Shamus Award for Best Novel (North of Nowhere, Blood is in the Sky)

Books
A Cold Day in Paradise (1998)
Winter of the Wolf Moon (2000) 
The Hunting Wind (2002) 
North of Nowhere (2003) 
Blood is the Sky (2004) 
Ice Run (2005) 
A Stolen Season (2006) 
Beneath the Book Tower: An Alex McKnight Short Story (2011) 
Misery Bay (2011) 
Die a Stranger (2012)
Let It Burn (2013)
Dead Man Running (2018)

References

Series of books
Mystery fiction bibliographies
 

4. http://authorstevehamilton.com/books/